The 2009–10 Superliga season was the 22nd since its establishment. Rayo Vallecano were the defending champions, having won their title in the previous season.

League expansion and format changes
On 26 May 2009, the Royal Spanish Football Federation presented a project to improve the Superliga, based in an expansion of the league from 16 to 24 teams, by inviting professional men's teams to join the tournament.

Eight teams agreed to join the league: two of them from La Liga (Sevilla and Valladolid), four from Segunda División (Las Palmas, Murcia, Gimnàstic and Eibar), one of Segunda División B (Jaén) and one from Tercera División (Cacereño). However, economical difficulties forced Cacereño and Murcia to withdraw before the start of the competition.

This project was rejected by the majority of participant clubs and players of the league. However, despite this strong opposition, on 14 July 2009, the new format was approved.

The teams were divided into three groups attending to geographical criteria. The winner and runner-up of each group and the two best third qualified teams would join the Group A in the second stage, for the title. The two first teams of the group A played the final of the league.

First round

Group A

Group B

Group C

Second round

Group A

Group B

Group C

Final

Final standings

See also
 2010 Copa de la Reina

References

Season on soccerway

2009-10
Spa
1
women